Terrell James (born 1955) is an American artist who makes abstract paintings, prints and sculptures.  She is best known for large scale work with paint on stretched fabric, and for parallel small scale explorations such as the Field Studies series, ongoing since 1997.  She lives and works in Houston, Texas.

Early life and education
Terrell James was born in Houston, Texas in 1955.  A seventh generation Texan, she graduated from Houston's Lamar High School in 1973. In 1973, James studied painting and printmaking at the Instituto Allende in San Miguel de Allende (Guanajuato, Mexico). During 1973–77 she attended The University of the South in Sewanee Tennessee, where she continued her studies in painting and printmaking.

Art practice

Painting

James' painting suggest ambiguous visions of nature, urban geometries and technical artifacts, resisting easy determination.  Instead of obvious images and visual stability, the viewer finds a pictorial landscape composed of alternate potential readings. Writing for the Museum of Fine Arts Houston, Daniel Stern stated that "To gaze at a painting of Terrell James' is to enter into an experience in the making: painting in which the act of painting continues on as the eye wanders the finished surface. Each individual painting is completed by each individual encounter."

Field Studies

James' numbered series Field Studies begin in 1997, are small works devoted to ongoing, open-ended visualization.  Curator Alison de Lima Greene has written: "Sometimes a drawn line darts across the field or serves as a scaffold, sometimes pale afterimages challenge the viewer's eye, and even the occasional collaged element is welcomed as well." Field Studies are often made in parallel with much larger synchronous works, tracking their internal color relationships in a secondary form.

Related work

Forrest Bess and archival research

From 1980 to 1985, James worked as a field collector and material archivist for the Archives of American Art, at the Smithsonian Institution. While in this position, she was involved in the cataloging and exhibition of works by artist Forrest Bess.  This assignment included her research involving Bess' family and contacts in Bay City, Texas, her cataloging of correspondence related to the artist's exhibition with New York gallerist Betty Parsons, and her organization of the 1986 exhibition of Forrest Bess' paintings in collaboration with Hiram Butler Gallery.  This show led to the involvement of other galleries, such as New York's Hirschl & Adler Modern.  Her research on Bess' life and work was seminal to the posthumous emergence of his worldwide following among collectors and institutions.  In addition to archival work, James was integrally involved in the production of films and books about Bess. James played the archetypal feminine figure of Forrest Bess in Jim Kanan's 1987 film of Bess, Fishmonger, and was a primary source for Chuck Smith's book Key to the Riddle.

Exhibitions

James has exhibited her work at a number of museums and public spaces, including the Contemporary Arts Museum Houston, the Museum of Fine Arts Houston, The Cameron Museum of Art (Wilmington NC) and the Centro Cultural Arte Contemporaneo (Mexico D.F.). the Art League Houston

Collections
 Whitney Museum of American Art
 Menil Collection, Houston 
 Watermill Collection (Robert Wilson Foundation, Water Mill, N.Y.)
 Casa Lamm/Televisa Cultural Foundation and Museum (Mexico, D.F.)
 Museum of Fine Arts, Boston
 Museum of Fine Arts Houston
 Dallas Museum of Art
 University of St. Thomas, Houston
 Albee Foundation, New York The Cameron Museum of Art (Wilmington, N.C.),
 Free International University World Art Collection, the Netherlands
 Centro Cultural Arte Contemporaneo Mexico D.F.
 Portland Art Museum, Oregon
 the Rice University Collection, Houston
 United States Department of Stat,
 Museum of the University of the South, Sewanee, Tennessee
 San Antonio Museum of Art
 Texas Tech University
 National Gallery of Art

Recognition and commentary
 Texas Artist of the Year (Art League Houston, 2016)
 2014 Texas Art Hall of Fame (Houston Fine Art Fair)
 2008 Texan-French Alliance for the Arts' TFAA Recognition Award
 Decorative Center Houston's 2013 Design Star Award
 2010 Visual Arts Fellowship from the Edward Albee Foundation

References

Further reading
 Bovee, Katherine</u>, Virgil Grotfeldt and Terrell James at Froelick Gallery, Art Lies, Issue No.58, p 104, 2008.
 Buhmann, Stephanie (September 2016), Place and Transition in the Work of Terrell James, HOVER: Art League 2016 Texas Artist of the Year, Houston TX, pp. 3–7.
 Buhmann, Stephanie, Terrell James: Witnessing Places, ArtSlant, London UK, November 2007.
 Della Monica, Lauren P., Painted Landscapes: Contemporary Views, Schiffer Publishing, 2013.  
 Gray, Lisa, About Time: Terrell James's art hangs near a crossroads where her past and present intersect, Houston Press, Houston TX, pp. 12–13, April 26, 2001.
 Greene, Alison de Lima, Terrell James: Field Studies, Houston TX, March 2011, pp. 3–5.
 Hodges, Steve, Walter Hopps: Standing Sideways (Terrell James and Virgil Grotfeldt), Glasstire, Houston TX, April, 2005.
 Hopps, Walter, (2004), The Painting of Terrell James, Jason McCoy Inc., New York NY.
 James, Terrell (July,2017), On Walter Hopps, The Brooklyn Rail, Brooklyn NY, Critics' Page.
 Paglia, Michael and Edwards, Jim, Texas Abstract: Modern / Contemporary, SF Design, llc/FrescoBooks, 2014..
 Petry, Michael (October 2016), The Abstraction of the Physical into the Poetic, Remember the Poison Tree, Cadogan Contemporary, London UK, pp. 7–12.
 Pillsbury, Edmund P. and Littman, Robert R.(2001), Impression and Sensation: The Painting of Terrell James, Pillsbury and Peters Fine Art, Dallas TX, pp. 2–4. ASIN B00SNWO4EA.

1955 births
Living people
Artists from Houston
Sewanee: The University of the South alumni
21st-century American painters
21st-century American women artists
20th-century American painters
20th-century American women artists
Painters from Texas